Terso Solutions, Inc., located in Madison, Wisconsin, USA, is the developer and distributor of an automated system for storage and distribution of high value research reagents and medical supplies. Terso first developed a reagent stocking system, which uses RAIN radio frequency identification (RFID) tags along with secure access control, linked to the internet. These combined technologies allow inventory to be securely tracked and managed remotely.

History 
Developed initially as an on-site inventory supplier for Promega products, the privately held Terso Solutions, Inc. was spun off from Promega Corporation in 2005. In February 2010, Terso Solutions formed Terso GmbH in Mannheim, Germany, in response to increasing demand for its RFID units in Europe. 

Terso Solutions employs 48 people. The company holds 17 United States patents, 2 European patents, and 3 Japanese patents. Joe Pleshek has been CEO of Terso Solutions since 2008.

References

Biotechnology companies of the United States
Companies based in Madison, Wisconsin
Radio-frequency identification companies